The Chardha (also Charda, Chardah or Hunza Rubab) is a stringed instrument from Pakistan and Afghanistan, from and mainly played in the Hunza valley and Gilgit-Baltistan province.
It has 4 or 5 main playing strings made of gut or nylon, and many metal resonance strings.

References

String instruments
Pakistani musical instruments
Afghan musical instruments